The list of Honorary Doctors of Lincoln University below shows the recipients of honorary doctorates conferred by Lincoln University in New Zealand since it attained full autonomy from the University of Canterbury in 1990.

References

 
Honorary Doctors of Lincoln University
Lincoln
New Zealand education-related lists